Wendy Richard  (born Wendy Emerton; 20 July 1943 – 26 February 2009) was an English actress, known for her television roles as Miss Shirley Brahms on the BBC sitcom Are You Being Served? from 1972 to 1985, and Pauline Fowler on the soap opera EastEnders from 1985 to 2006.

Despite being known for her Cockney accent, Richard was born in Middlesbrough. After a childhood in which her father died by suicide, Richard worked in department stores to pay her drama school fees before appearing regularly on-screen from the early 1960s. She played Joyce Harker in The Newcomers from 1967 to 1969. Richard then starred in two Carry On films. In the television series Dad's Army, she was Private Walker's girlfriend, before being cast as Miss Brahms in Are You Being Served? appearing in all 69 episodes from 1972 to 1985. She also reprised the role in the sequel series Grace and Favour in 1992 and 1993.

After Are You Being Served? ended, Richard starred as Pauline Fowler in the first episode of EastEnders, a main role that she played in over two thousand episodes until she departed in 2006. Richard was awarded an MBE in 2000 and in 2007, she was awarded the 'Lifetime Achievement Award' at the British Soap Awards for her role in EastEnders. 

After leaving EastEnders, Richard continued to appear on-screen until her death in 2009. Richard was married four times. She was diagnosed with breast cancer in 1996; the disease returned in 2002 and again in 2008; this time it had spread throughout her body. Richard made a documentary detailing the last few months of her life before her death in February 2009.

Early life
Wendy Emerton, an only child, was born on 20 July 1943 in Middlesbrough. Her parents, Henry and Beatrice Reay (née Cutter) Emerton, were publicans and ran the Corporation Hotel in the town. Emerton and Cutter married in Paddington, London in 1939. While Wendy was a baby, her family moved to Bournemouth. While living in Bournemouth, Wendy and her friend got stuck after trying to climb the cliffs and had to be rescued by the fire brigade. The family later moved to the Isle of Wight and then to London and ran the Shepherds Tavern, Shepherd Market, Mayfair where Elizabeth Taylor and Antony Armstrong-Jones, 1st Earl of Snowdon are said to have been customers. 

Richard enjoyed several family holidays to Jersey and Blackpool before attending the local school, St George's Hanover Square Primary, but her education was interrupted when her family moved again, this time to the Valentine Hotel at Gants Hill, Essex. Another move, to the Streatham Park Hotel, Streatham, south London, followed a few months later. It was there, in December 1954, that Richard's father committed suicide. Richard, then 11, found his body. Her mother, Beatrice, never remarried, and died of liver cancer in May 1972.

She was enrolled at The Royal Masonic School for Girls in Rickmansworth after her father's death, as Henry had been a Freemason, and help with fees was provided by the organisation. She found the school excessively strict and her art mistress called her paintings and drawings "affected, rather like herself". Richard dreamed of becoming a TV continuity girl or film star from a young age and, after leaving school at 15, helped to pay her way through the Italia Conti Academy of Theatre Arts in London by working in the fashion department at the Fortnum and Mason department store. She briefly worked at Fenwicks but was sacked after two days for telling a customer a coat did not suit her after the customer asked her for her opinion. It was at that time that she decided to change her surname to Richard, because "it was short and neat". 

While at the Italia Conti, Richard became a model and picked up several modelling jobs for magazines such as Woman's Own. Still at drama school, she was run over by a car when crossing the road outside the Italia Conti school. Her injuries were so severe that her friend phoned Richard's mother from the hospital thinking she was dead; she had to have thirty-three stitches in her head. She made her television debut in November 1961 when she appeared alongside Mandy Rice-Davies with Sammy Davis, Jr. in the ATV variety show Saturday Spectacular.Career
Upon leaving drama school, Richard wrote to theatrical agents hoping to be taken on for work, including Robert Stigwood. In 1962, her distinctive cockney vocals helped get her to No. 1 on the UK singles chart with the single "Come Outside" by Mike Sarne who was managed by Stigwood. This was followed by many promotional appearances which exposed her to television audiences.

Drawing on from the success of Come Outside, Richard was taken on by the Lom Artists agency and her first role with her new agent was in the sitcom Bulldog Breed with Amanda Barrie for Granada Television before starring as Susan Sullivan, a receptionist, in five episodes of Harpers West One, an ATV television drama series about a fictional department store. Richard then appeared in series such as Danger Man, No Hiding Place, Hugh and I and The Contact with John Hurt. In 1965, she appeared in an episode of the original Likely Lads series as a household cleaner saleswoman called Lynn. Richard also appears in a scene cut from the released version of The Beatles movie Help! (1965). She also had a small role as a nurse in Doctor in Clover (1966).

Richard first became familiar to television audiences in 1967 playing teenage supermarket till girl Joyce Harker, a regular character, in The Newcomers until the show's end in 1969. After The Newcomers ended, Richard had a recurring role as Edith Parish, Private Walker's usherette girlfriend in Dad's Army from 1970 to 1973, and had roles in several television series including Up Pompeii!, Please Sir! and On the Buses before appearing in Both Ends Meet, a sitcom about a sausage factory with Dora Bryan. 

From 1972 to 1985, Richard was a regular cast member of the sitcom Are You Being Served? as Shirley Brahms, an attractive, young shop assistant with a strong Cockney accent. Set in the ladies and gentleman's clothing department in the fictional department store Grace Brothers with Miss Brahms being under the eye of Mrs Slocombe and being the subject of menswear junior Mr Lucas's advances. Richard later reprised her role in the Are You Being Served? sequel Grace & Favour, which aired from 1992 to 1993. 

Richard appeared in two Carry On films, playing small roles in Carry On Matron (1972) and Carry On Girls (1973) (both films also featured her future EastEnders colleague Barbara Windsor). Richard's other film roles around this time included No Blade of Grass (1970), Gumshoe (1971) starring Albert Finney, and the film versions of On The Buses (1971), Bless This House (1972), and Are You Being Served? (1977). While appearing in Are You Being Served?, she had parts in The Fenn Street Gang, Z Cars and Bowler as well as having regular roles in Hogg's Back and Not On Your Nellie.

EastEnders
The same year that Are You Being Served? ended, Richard began appearing as the matriarch Pauline Fowler in the BBC soap opera EastEnders, a role she played from the first episode in 1985. The character has been described as a "legend" and a television icon, but was also voted the 35th "most annoying person of 2006" (being the only fictional character to appear on the list). Pauline has been the subject of television documentaries, behind-the-scenes books, tie-in novels, and comedy sketch shows. 

On 10 July 2006, the BBC announced that Richard had decided to leave the series after more than 20 years. Until the onscreen death of her character at Christmas 2006, she was one of only two original cast members of that programme to appear continuously from the first episode in 1985, along with Adam Woodyatt, who played her on-screen nephew Ian Beale.

In 2007, Richard was awarded a British Soap Award for 'Special Achievement' for her role in EastEnders.Later career
Richard appeared regularly on the BBC Radio programme Just a Minute from 1989 until 1994. She returned for the programme's television iteration in 1999 and for further appearances on radio in 2002 and 2003. 

Richard was interviewed on Channel 4 Racing in August 1993, when she was a spectator at Sandown races. She mentioned she had backed a horse called "Time of Grace" because of its name-association with Grace Brothers.

In 2000, Richard was appointed Member of the Order of the British Empire (MBE) in the Queen's Birthday Honours. 

In late 2006, Richard was seen as a guest presenter on the BBC's City Hospital series and on 31 March 2007, she presented the documentary A Tribute to John Inman, for BBC2. She also gave interviews for the first time in many years, making appearances on The Paul O'Grady Show, Big Brother's Little Brother, Loose Women, Parkinson, and the Biography Channel special Gloria's Greats with Gloria Hunniford, amongst others.

In April 2007, Richard announced that she would be appearing in a new role for the first time since leaving EastEnders, in a new sitcom penned by David Croft called Here Comes The Queen. The project came about after she personally asked Croft to write something for her. Richard had commented: "The part is like an older version of Miss Brahms". A pilot episode was made, which was considered to be poor, and it was never transmitted. 

In September 2007, it was announced that Richard was to join the second series of ITV1's sitcom Benidorm playing a "loud-mouthed, rude" character who used a wheelchair; her episode aired in April 2008. 

In January 2008, adverts for The Post Office featuring Richard (as a human cannonball) began to be shown. 

In February 2008, she landed the role of Mrs. Crump in the episode "A Pocket Full of Rye" of the Agatha Christie's Marple TV series starring Julia McKenzie. This was her final role, airing after her death in 2009.

Personal life
Richard was married four times. Her first marriage was to a music publisher, Len Blach, in 1972, which lasted just five months. For six years, she lived with an advertising director, Will Thorpe; she married Thorpe in 1980, leaving him after 18 months of marriage. Her third marriage, to Paul Glorney, a carpet fitter, took place in Westminster, London, in 1990. That marriage ended in divorce four years later. Richard later lived with John Burns, a painter and decorator 20 years her junior, in the Marylebone area of London. They lived together from 1996 and married on 10 October 2008 at a hotel in Mayfair. They remained together until her death four months later. She had no children.

Richard was a supporter of the Conservative Party. She was particularly supportive of Margaret Thatcher and her policies. During her early years on EastEnders, scriptwriters gave Richard a script in which Pauline Fowler launched into a tirade against Thatcher, but Richard refused to perform it.

Illness
In 1996, Richard was diagnosed with breast cancer. She had surgery and was given the all-clear, but experienced a recurrence of the disease in 2002.BBC News – EastEnders star has cancer. Retrieved 5 October 2008 Her cancer went into remission after years of treatment and she was given a clean bill of health in 2005. Articles about her departure from EastEnders suggested that her health problems did not play any role in her decision, but was because her character in the soap remarried, to Richard's displeasure. Richard later said she left because of stress and that she had been stress-free since leaving the show. She kept in touch with co-stars Bill Treacher, Natalie Cassidy, Todd Carty, and James Alexandrou. 

In January 2008, cancer cells were found in her left armpit, and it was reported in the Sunday Express on 5 October 2008 that she had been diagnosed with an aggressive form of breast cancer. Further investigation showed that it had metastasised to her left kidney and bones, including her spine and left ribs. She made a half-hour programme, Wendy Richard: To Tell You the Truth, documenting the last three months of her life, which was broadcast on BBC One on 19 March 2009.

Death

Richard's agent, Kevin Francis, reported she had died on 26 February 2009 of breast cancer, aged 65, at a clinic in Harley Street, London. Her husband, John Burns, was at her bedside. Francis said: "She was incredibly brave and retained her sense of humour right to the end." On the day of her death, that evening's episode of EastEnders and a memorial programme, both dedicated to Richard, were broadcast on BBC One. Actor Bill Treacher, Richard's on-screen husband Arthur Fowler in EastEnders, said the actress was a "true professional." 

Richard's funeral, on 9 March 2009 at St Marylebone Parish Church, was attended by many in the media industry and many fans. Her body was later cremated at a private service at Golders Green Crematorium. It was reported the actress had already planned her funeral and written her will. In July 2009, David Croft, the creator of Are You Being Served?'', unveiled a Heritage Foundation commemorative plaque at The Shepherds Tavern in London's West End, which Richard's parents had run. A number of entertainers were there to pay their respects on the occasion.

Filmography

Film

Television

References

External links

 
 
 

1943 births
2009 deaths
20th-century English actresses
21st-century English actresses
Actresses from London
Alumni of the Italia Conti Academy of Theatre Arts
British comedy actresses
Conservative Party (UK) people
Deaths from cancer in England
Deaths from breast cancer
English soap opera actresses
English television actresses
English film actresses
Members of the Order of the British Empire
People educated at the Royal Masonic School
Actors from Bournemouth
People from Marylebone
Actresses from Yorkshire
Actresses from Dorset
People from Bournemouth